André Barrais (February 22, 1920 – January 15, 2004) was a French basketball player. He competed in the 1948 Summer Olympics. In 1948, Barrais was part of the French basketball team, which won the silver medal. He died in Brest in 2004.

References

External links
André Barrais' profile at databaseOlympics

1920 births
2004 deaths
French men's basketball players
Olympic basketball players of France
Basketball players at the 1948 Summer Olympics
Olympic silver medalists for France
Olympic medalists in basketball
Medalists at the 1948 Summer Olympics